Dr. Harak Singh Rawat (born 15 December 1960) is a prominent political leader of the Uttarakhand state in India. He is a member of Indian National Congress after being expelled from the BJP in 2022. After joining Congress he negotiated an MLA ticket for his daughter in law, Anukriti Gusain, from Congress party and worked as a star campaigner in 2022 Uttarakhand General Elections. He became the youngest Minister of Uttar Pradesh State in the year 1991 and also won assembly election from Pauri. He has also won as an MLA from Rudraprayag, Lansdowne and Kotdwar and is one of the few leaders in the state with a wide appeal in a large area. He was the candidate of Indian National Congress from Garhwal in 2014 Indian general election. He was expelled from BJP and the Cabinet led by Pushkar Singh Dhami stating that he has indulged in anti-party activities and he is demanding ticket for his daughter in law (Anukriti) as well for the Uttarakhand Assembly Elections 2022. He later joined Congress in the presence of former Uttarakhand CM Harish Rawat.

Early life and education 

Rawat completed postgraduate work in arts in 1984 and earned his Doctor of Philosophy in Military Science from Hemwati Nandan Bahuguna Garhwal University, Srinagar, Uttarakhand in 1996.

He has been also linked with many women, apart from his legal wife. This includes one Sonia Anand, who has publicly claimed that he is father of her children. He was also an accused in the Jenny rape case in early 2000s.

Politics 
 In 2017 elected from Kotdwara Uttarakhand Vidhan Sabha.
 In 2012 elected from Rudraprayag Uttarakhand Vidhan Sabha.
 In 2007 elected as Leader of opposition Uttarakhand Vidhan Sabha.
 In 2007 was re-elected from Lansdowne Uttarakhand Vidhan Sabha.
 In 2002 after winning from Lansdowne Constituency was designated Cabinet Minister of four departments – Revenue, Food & Civil Supplies, Disaster Management and Rehabilitation.
 In 2002 was elected as MLA from 32 Lansdowne Vidhan Sabha Constituency
 In 1997 was appointed member of Uttar Pradesh Congress Working Committee.
 From 1997–present member of Uttar Pradesh Congress Committee.
 In 1997 was appointed vice-chairman (Equivalent to Cabinet Minister Rank) in Uttar Pradesh Khadi Gram Udyog Board.
 In 1993 was re-elected as M.L.A. from Pauri Assembly
 From 1991 to 1993 was youngest Tourism Minister in U.P.
 In 1991 won assembly election from Pauri and became youngest Minister of U.P. State.

Positions held

References 

Living people
Members of the Uttarakhand Legislative Assembly
Indian National Congress politicians
United Progressive Alliance candidates in the 2014 Indian general election
State cabinet ministers of Uttarakhand
Leaders of the Opposition in Uttarakhand
1960 births
Bharatiya Janata Party politicians from Uttarakhand
Uttarakhand MLAs 2017–2022